The Roman Catholic Diocese of Daming is a diocese located in the city of Daming in the Ecclesiastical province of Beijing in China.

History
 March 11, 1935: Established as Apostolic Prefecture of Daming 大名 from the Apostolic Vicariate of Xianxian 獻縣
 July 10, 1947: Promoted as Diocese of Daming 大名

Leadership
 Bishops of Daming 大名 (Roman Rite)
 Stephen Yang Xiangtai, Bishop Coadjutor (1996–1999) and a Diocesan Bishop (1999–2016) 
 Fr. Gaspar Lischerong, S.J. (Apostolic Administrator July 10, 1947 – 1972)
 Prefects Apostolic of Daming 大名 (Roman Rite)
 Fr. Nicola Szarvas, S.J. (January 31, 1936 – 1947)

References
 (for Chronology of Bishops)
 (for Chronology of Bishops)

Roman Catholic dioceses in China
Christian organizations established in 1935
Roman Catholic dioceses and prelatures established in the 20th century
Christianity in Hebei
1935 establishments in China